The smooth newt, European newt, northern smooth newt or common newt (Lissotriton vulgaris) is a species of newt. It is widespread in Europe and parts of Asia, and has been introduced into Australia. Individuals are brown with a spotted underside that ranges in color from orange to white. The newts' skins are dry and velvety when they are living on land, but become smooth when they migrate into the water to breed. Males develop a more vivid colour pattern and a conspicuous skin seam (crest) on their back when breeding.

The smooth newt was originally described by Carl Linnaeus as a lizard, and was then given different genus names before the adoption of its current classification as a member of Lissotriton. There are currently three accepted subspecies of smooth newt. Formerly, there were also four subspecies—all with more restricted ranges—that are now classified as separate species, because they have been found to be distinct genetically as well as in appearance: the Caucasian smooth newt, the Greek smooth newt, Kosswig's smooth newt and Schmidtler's smooth newt. Together with these four species and the Carpathian newt, the smooth newt forms what is known as a species complex: some of the species hybridise with each other.

For most of the year, smooth newts live on land, are mostly nocturnal, and hide during the day. They can adapt to a wide range of natural or semi-natural habitats, from forests at field edges to parks and gardens. They feed mainly on invertebrates such as insects and earthworms and are themselves eaten mainly by fish, birds and snakes. Between spring and summer, they breed in ponds or similar bodies of water. Males court females with a ritualised underwater display. Females lay their eggs on water plants, and larvae hatch after 10 to 20 days. The larvae develop for around three months before metamorphosing into terrestrial juveniles, at which point they become known as efts. They reach maturity after two to three years, and the adults live for up to 14 years.

The smooth newt is abundant over much of its range and is classified as a species of least concern by the International Union for Conservation of Nature (IUCN). It has been negatively affected by habitat destruction and fragmentation and by the introduction of new species of fish. Like other European amphibians, the smooth newt has now been listed as a protected species by the Berne Convention.

Taxonomy

Swedish naturalist Carl Linnaeus described the smooth newt in 1758 as Lacerta vulgaris, placing it in the same genus as the green lizards. It was later re-described under several different species and genus names, including Triton, Molge, Salamandra and Lissotriton, with in total 48 species synonyms published. Most recently, it was included in the genus Triturus, along with most European newts. This genus was found to be polyphyletic, containing several unrelated lineages, and the small-bodied newts, including the smooth newt, were therefore split off as separate genus in 2004 by García-París and colleagues. They used the name Lissotriton, introduced by the English zoologist Thomas Bell in 1839 with the smooth newt as type species but then considered a synonym of Triturus. "Lissotriton" is a combination of the Greek , meaning "smooth", and the name of Triton, an ancient Greek god of the sea, while the species epithet  means "common" in Latin.

Three subspecies are accepted by Pabijan, Wielstra and colleagues: L. v. vulgaris, L. v. ampelensis and L. v. meridionalis. These authors, followed by Amphibian Species of the World, recognise four former subspecies from southern Europe and west Asia as separate species, as they are morphologically and genetically distinct: the Greek smooth newt (L. graecus), Kosswig's smooth newt (L. kosswigi), the Caucasian smooth newt (L. lantzi) and Schmidtler's smooth newt (L. schmidtleri). The five smooth newt species and the Carpathian newt (L. montadoni), which is their sister species, have collectively been referred to as the "smooth newt species complex".

To distinguish the smooth newt from its close relatives, the English name "northern smooth newt" has been suggested. Other common names that have been used in the literature include: common newt, great water-newt, common water-newt, warty eft, water eft, common smooth newt, small newt, small eft, small evet, and brown eft.

Evolution

Molecular phylogenetic analyses have shown that the smooth newt is distinct from its four close relatives – the Caucasian, Greek, Kosswig's, and Schmidtler's smooth newt – which were formerly considered subspecies (see section Taxonomy above). The relationships within this species complex have not been fully resolved. Within the smooth newt itself, genetic groups do not completely match the currently accepted subspecies (ampelensis, meridionalis, vulgaris), described based on morphology. The five smooth newt species collectively were estimated to have diverged from the Carpathian newt around four to six million years ago.

Genetic analyses have also demonstrated ongoing gene flow between the smooth newt and its relatives. Although the Carpathian newt is morphologically clearly different, hybridisation between the two species is frequent; it has been shown that smooth newt mitochondrial DNA has introgressed into and completely replaced that of the Carpathian newt populations. Partial introgression also occurred from the smooth newt to the Greek smooth newt. These patterns are likely due to the range expansion and secondary contact of species after the Last Glacial Maximum, which they likely survived in refugia mainly in southern and eastern Europe. The palmate newt (Lissotriton helveticus), although often occurring in the same habitats, almost never hybridises with the smooth newt. Artificial crosses with even more distant species such as the alpine (Ichthyosaura alpestris) and northern crested (Triturus cristatus) newts were successful in laboratory experiments.

Description

General characteristics

Adult males of the smooth newt reach around  head-to-tail length and are thus slightly larger than the females, which reach . The head is longer than it is wide, with 2–3 longitudinal grooves on the top, and the elongated snout is blunt in the male and rounded in the female. The skin is velvety and water-repellent on land but smooth during the aquatic phase; it contains mucus and toxin glands and its upper layer is shed off regularly.

Outside the breeding season, both sexes are yellow-brown, brown or olive-brown. The male has dark, round spots, while the female has smaller spots of the same colour, which sometimes form two or more irregular lines along the back. The male has an orange strip on the tail underside, and the throat and belly in males are orange to white with small dark, rounded spots (these are lighter with smaller spots in the female). Size and colour vary with the environment, and the newts tend to be smaller in northern latitudes. Albinistic and leucistic individuals have been described.

The smooth newt is diploid (i.e. it has two copies of each chromosome), with 24 chromosomes in total.

Breeding characteristics

During the aquatic breeding season, males develop a skin seam or crest, which runs uninterrupted along the back and the tail. The tail also has a lower fin, and its end is pointed. The cloaca (the single digestive, urinary and reproductive orifice) of breeding males is swollen, round and dark-coloured. The hindfeet have more or less developed toe flaps, depending on the subspecies. Colours in general are more vivid than during the land phase. The dark spots grow larger, and the crest often has vertical dark and bright bands. There are five to seven longitudinal stripes on the head. The lower edge of the tail is red with a silver-blue flash and black spots. Females only develop low, straight tail fins but no crest or toe flaps, and are more drably coloured.

Subspecies differ slightly in male secondary characteristics: L. v. ampelensis has strongly developed toe flaps, its tail tapers into a fine thread (but not a distinct filament), and the body is slightly square in cross-section. L. v. meridionalis also has toe flaps and a pointed tail, its crest is smooth-edged, and its body is square-shaped. In the nominate subspecies, L. v. vulgaris, the crest is clearly denticulated, toe flaps are only weakly developed and the body is round.

Larvae

They initially have, in addition to their gills, only two balancers at the sides of the head, short appendages for attaching to plants which get resorbed within a few days. As in all salamanders, forelegs develop before the hindlegs. The colour becomes a more cryptic, darkly marbled yellow to brown in the growing larvae. Larvae are very slender and similar to the palmate newt. They develop a skin seam from the neck to the pointed tail; the tail is as long as the head and trunk.

Similar species

The smooth newt resembles the other, less widespread Lissotriton species. It can be confused especially with the closely related "smooth newt complex" species (marked with * in the table below) and the more distant palmate newt, which often occurs in the same area. Females are especially difficult to tell apart, as distinguishing features are mainly observed in the males at breeding season.

Distribution

Native range

The smooth newt has been described as "the most ubiquitous and widely distributed newt of the Old World". The nominate subspecies, L. v. vulgaris, is most widespread and ranges natively from Ireland (where the smooth newt is the only newt species) and Great Britain in the west to Siberia and northern Kazakhstan in the east. In the north it reaches central Fennoscandia, and its southern limit is central France, northern Italy, the central Balkans and the dry Eurasian steppe of Ukraine and Russia. The subspecies L. v. ampelensis only occurs in the Carpathians of Ukraine and the Danube delta of northern Romania, and L. v. meridionalis in the northern half of Italy, southern Switzerland, Slovenia and Croatia.

In the Carpathians, the smooth newt generally prefers lower elevations than the Carpathian newt. In the Balkans, the precise contact zones with the Greek smooth newt and Schmidtler's smooth newt are not yet clear. In central Italy, where the range of the smooth newt subspecies L. v. meridionalis overlaps with that of the Italian newt (L. italicus), it was found that the latter prefers a warmer and drier climate.

Introduced range

The nominate subspecies, L. v. vulgaris, has been introduced to Australia, which has no native salamander species. The smooth newt was available in the Australian pet trade until 1997, when it was declared a "controlled pest animal" because of the risk of introduction. The first record in the wild was made near Melbourne in 2011, and larvae were later found, indicating successful reproduction. Negative impacts on the native fauna are feared, including predation on and competition with native frogs and freshwater invertebrates, toxicity, and disease spread. The smooth newt could spread further in south-eastern Australia, where wide areas have a suitable climate.

Within Europe, the subspecies L. v. meridionalis was introduced north of the Alps near Geneva, where it hybridises with the native L. v. vulgaris.

Habitat and ecology

Mainly a lowland species, the smooth newt is only exceptionally found above . Thes species shows a wide habitat breadth, as it's able to thrive in a wide array of terrestrial and aquatic environments. On land, it occurs in wooded areas (dense conifer woods are avoided) but also in more open areas such as damp meadows, field edges, parks and gardens. It can also tolerate human disturbance and urban environments. The newts hide under structures such as logs or stones or in small mammal burrows. Smooth newts may also climb vegetation, although the exact function of this is not currently known.

Freshwater breeding sites are typically sun-exposed, free from fish, stagnant, water-filled permanently or for at least three months of the year, close to similar water bodies, and have shallow areas with abundant water plants. They can range from small puddles to larger ponds or shallow parts of lakes. Water quality is less important; pH values from 4 (more acidic) to 9.6 (more alkaline) are tolerated and in Germany, smooth newts have even been found in slightly brackish water. They often share breeding sites with other amphibians, including other newts; in northern France, ponds with five newt species – smooth, palmate, alpine, northern crested and marbled (T. marmoratus) newt – have been described.

Lifecycle and behaviour

Smooth newts live on land during most of the year and are mainly nocturnal. They also usually hibernate on land, often in congregations of several newts in winter shelters such as under logs or in burrows (but they can be active during mild weather). The efts turn into mature adults at two to three years, and the newts can reach an age of 6–14 years in the wild. The newts recognise familiar territory using smell and visual cues, but could not orient themselves in experiments when they were transported far away from the home range.

Reproduction

Migration to the breeding sites occurs as soon as February, but in the northern parts of the range and at higher altitudes, it may not start before summer. After entering the water, the breeding characters, especially the male's crest, take a few weeks to develop.

Mating involves an intricate courtship display: the male attempts to attract a female by swimming in front of her and sniffing her cloaca. He then vibrates his tail against his body, sometimes violently lashing it, thereby fanning pheromones towards her. In the final phase, he moves away from her, the tail quivering. If she is still interested, she will follow him and touch his cloaca with her snout, whereupon he deposits a packet of sperm (a spermatophore). He then guides her over the spermatophore so she picks it up with her cloaca. Males often try to lead females away from displaying competitors.

Eggs are fertilised internally, and progeny of one female usually has multiple fathers. Females tend to mate preferentially with unrelated males, probably to avoid inbreeding depression.

Females lay 100–500 eggs, usually folding them into waterplants. Larvae typically hatch after 10–20 days, depending on temperature, and metamorphose into terrestrial efts after around three months.

Paedomorphism, where adults stay aquatic and retain their gills and skin seams or only resorb them partially, occurs regularly but only in a small proportion of individuals. It does not appear to be determined genetically but favoured by cold water, a low density of individuals and abundant aquatic prey. Wild paedomorphic individuals often metamorphosed when they were transferred into an aquarium.

Diet, predators and parasites

Smooth newts, including the larvae, are unselective carnivores, feeding mainly on diverse invertebrates such as earthworms, snails, slugs, bivalves, spiders, ticks, mites, springtails or insects and insect larvae, or smaller plankton. Cannibalism also occurs, mainly by preying on eggs of its own species. Various predators eat smooth newts, including waterbirds, snakes and frogs, but also larger newts such as the northern crested newt.

Various pathogens and parasites have been found to infect smooth newts, including ranaviruses, a picornavirus, various protozoans, trematodes (of which Parastrigea robusta was found to cause the local decline of a population in Germany) and at least 31 species of helminths.

Threats and conservation

The smooth newt is common over much of its range. The IUCN, in 2008, assessed its threat status as Least Concern and found no general decline in populations. This assessment included subspecies now recognised as separate species (see section Taxonomy above) and needs updating. Despite the overall low concern, the smooth newt is listed in some national red lists, e.g. in Switzerland, the Czech Republic, and the Netherlands. Like all amphibians, it is also listed as protected species in the Berne Convention (Appendix III). Disturbance, capture, killing and trade are prohibited in Ireland under the Wildlife Act 1976, and trade in the UK under the Wildlife and Countryside Act 1981.

Threats to smooth newts are similar to those affecting other amphibians. They include especially the loss of breeding ponds through destruction or introduction of fish, and the fragmentation of population through roads. Secondary habitats can help sustain the species, e.g. former gravel pits or quarries left open. The value of artificial water bodies as habitat can be improved when nearby hiding structures like stones or wood are added on land. Garden ponds are readily colonised if they are sun-exposed, have abundant water plants, no fish, and nearby hiding structures. Artificial hibernation sites ("newt hotels") were readily used in a study in Norway, especially by juveniles.

To mark and track individuals and monitor populations, researchers have often amputated phalanges of fingers and toes but these re-grow quickly; a safer and less harmful alternative is recording the individual belly patterns through photography. Researchers have also developed genetic methods based on microsatellite distribution to assess patterns of genetic diversity.

Captivity

Smooth newts can be kept in captivity, but must come from a legal source under the applicable legislation given their protected status (see above). The juveniles remain terrestrial and will only return to water at maturity. Individuals have reached ages of 4–8, exceptionally up to 20 years, in captivity.

References

Lissotriton
Amphibians described in 1758
Taxa named by Carl Linnaeus
Amphibians of Europe
Invasive animal species in Australia
Amphibians of Asia